Azzo VI (1170 – November 1212), also known as Azzolino, was an Italian nobleman and condottiero. He held the title of Marquis of Este (marchio Eystensis) from the death of his father, Azzo V (1190) until his death.

Biography
He was heavily involved in the Guelph politics of Lombardy in the first decade of the 13th century, serving as podestà of Ferrara (1196, 1205, and 1208), Padua (1199), Verona (1206–1207), and Mantua (1207–1208 and 1210–1211).

In his capacity as a leading Guelph condottiero Azzo fought a prolonged war with Salinguerra Torelli. In 1205 he conquered and razed the castle of Fratta, residence of Salinguerra. His opponent responded by allying with Ezzelino II da Romano and drove Azzo away, but the next year (1206) he had reconquered Fratta, which he held until 1209.

When Emperor Otto IV descended to Italy, he had Azzo and Salinguerra reconciled. However, after Salinguerra left the alliance, Azzo entered the league formed by Pope Innocent III against the emperor. In 1208 the pope made him Marquis of Ancona, while the people of Ferrara named him at the city's seignior.

In 1212 Azzo sided with the exiles from Vicenza in the war against Ezzelino, but the latter defeated him at Pontalto near Vicenza. Azzo took refuge in Verona, where he died in November of that year.

Family
Azzo's first wife Elisa, a daughter of a count Aldobrandino, was dead by 1192. They had a son, Aldobrandino I, who succeeded his father in 1212 (who had a daughter, Beatrice d'Este, Queen of Hungary).

By 1192 he had remarried to a daughter of Humbert III of Savoy, named either Sophia or Eleanor (as per the epitaph of their daughter Beatrice). She died on 3 December 1202. They had his only daughter, Beatrice, later Abbess of Monte Gemmola.

On 22 February 1204 Azzo married for the third time to Alice (also called Alix), daughter of Raynald of Châtillon, Prince of Antioch. She was more likely the daughter of Raynald's last wife, Stephanie de Milly. By his third and last wife he left a son, Azzo VII, who eventually succeeded his elder brother and became head of the family.

Culture
Azzo's court was a cultural centre in northern Italy, drawing poets and artists from afar. He played host and patron to the troubadours Aimeric de Peguilhan, Peire Raimon de Tolosa, and Rambertino Buvalelli. Rambertino celebrated Azzo's daughter Beatrice in all of his love songs, an overtly political act in the climate of the times.

In a contemporary vernacular vita of his daughter, the biography sums up Azzo's character and reputation: "he was beautiful of form, almost more than all other men. A prudent yet daring man, valiant in feats of arms and of perspicacious learning: a wise and marvellous conversationalist." Azzo is also mentioned in the third canto of Ludovico Ariosto's Orlando Furioso, where the sorceress is telling Bradamant of his illustrious descendants:

References

Sources

External links

Modena/Ferrara,  Marchesi d'Este at Medieval Lands Project

|-

1170 births
1212 deaths
Azzo 6
13th-century condottieri
12th-century Italian nobility
13th-century Italian nobility